Major League was an American rock band from Mantua Township, New Jersey. They were signed to No Sleep Records.

History
Major League began in 2009. In July 2012, the group performed a few shows in Canada in July with The Swellers. They signed to No Sleep Records in September. They supported Man Overboard on their four date east coast tour in 2012. They partook in a co-headlining tour with Turnover and Maker in late 2012. In Spring of 2013, Major League supported Senses Fail on their headlining spring tour. In early 2014, Major League embarked on a headlining tour with support from Have Mercy, Seaway, and Better Off. In January 2014, vocalist Nick Trask departed from the band. In a statement released by Trask, he said:
 In the fall of 2014, Major League supported Mayday Parade on their headlining tour.

They went on to support Silverstein and Beartooth, Hidden In Plain View, Vans Warped Tour 2015 and closing 2015 supporting Comeback Kid and Stray From The Path.

On February 10, 2016, Major League announced they are breaking up, as well as announcing a final fifteen date tour with Forever Came Calling and Sudden Suspension.

Brian Anthony Joyce has since gone on to create a solo indie-pop project, Val Astaire.

Band members
Nick Trask - Lead Vocals (2009-2014)
Brian Anthony Joyce – Backing Vocals (2009-2014), Guitar (2009-2016), Lead vocals (2014-2016) 
Luke Smartnick – Drums (2011-2016)
Kyle Bell – Bass (2012-2016)
Matt Chila – Guitar (2009-2016)
Justin Unruh - Drums (2009-2011)
 Eric Bouda - Bass (2009-2012)

Discography
Studio albums
 Hard Feelings (2012)
 There's Nothing Wrong with Me (2014)

Compilation albums
 Mixtape (2011)

Extended plays
 The Truth Is... (2010)
 Variables (2011)

References

External links

Musical groups from New Jersey
No Sleep Records artists
People from Mantua Township, New Jersey